Amos Kash (2 June 1868 (OS)/15 June 1868 (NS) – 4 December 1948) was a Russian Empire sport shooter who competed in the 1912 Summer Olympics. He was part of the Russian 30 metre military pistol team that won the silver medal. He also competed in the 30 metre rapid fire pistol event finishing 28th and in the 50 metre pistol finishing 46th.

References

External links
Amos Kash's profile at databaseOlympics

1868 births
1948 deaths
Sportspeople from Saint Petersburg
Male sport shooters from the Russian Empire
ISSF pistol shooters
Shooters at the 1912 Summer Olympics
Olympic competitors for the Russian Empire
Olympic medalists in shooting
Medalists at the 1912 Summer Olympics